PEPSU Road Transport Corporation (PRTC), is a bus operator in Punjab state of India, is a state-run corporation headquartered at Patiala. Originally, it was formed as the Road Transport Corporation of the erstwhile state of PEPSU but when it was merged into Punjab, it became the Road Transport Corporation of whole of Punjab. Later in 1966, when Haryana and Himachal were carved out of Punjab, they formed their own Road Transport Companies. It has a fleet of 931 buses.
The PRTC (Pepsu Road Transport Corporation), Patiala was set up on 16 October 1956 under the provision of the Road Transport Corporations Act, 1950, with a view to provide efficient, adequate, economic and properly co-ordinated operation system of Road Transport Services in the State.  It commenced passenger transport operations with a meagre investment of ₹25.00 lacs and the fleet of 60 buses covering 11,107 daily scheduled kilometers on 15 routes with 345 employees. At present, the PRTC had owned 1142 ordinary buses, 600 routes (including inter-state routes) covering a daily mileage of 349,928 kilometers. It has 3,993 employees of which 1022 are regular.  PRTC has 9 depot and 15 bus stands across the Punjab located at Patiala, Bathinda, Kapurthala, Barnala, Sangrur, Budhlada, Faridkot, Ludhiana, Chandigarh and Special Cell of KM Scheme at Patiala.
Sardar Manmohan Singh Sathiala held the post of chairman of PRTC from 2000 to 2002 and introduced Kilometre scheme, initiated GPS system on its buses and built bus stand at historic city of Talwandi Sabo.

Infrastructure

And total fleet is 2549 [All Fleet Comprises]
 Punjab Roadways / PUNBUS - 1618 
 Pepsu - 931

References 

 Pepsu Road Transport Corporation Patiala

External links
 

Bus companies of India
Transport in Punjab, India
State agencies of Punjab, India
State road transport corporations of India
Transport in Patiala
1956 establishments in East Punjab
Transport companies established in 1956
Government agencies established in 1956
Companies based in Punjab, India